Triplophysa orientalis is a species of stone loach. It is a freshwater fish from the Tibetan Plateau and is endemic to China; its distribution includes the upper reaches of the Yangtze and Yellow Rivers, among others. It lives in a wide range of habitats, both lentic and lotic. The species is widespread but populations tend to be isolated and show high degree of genetic divergence.

References 

orientalis
Taxa named by Solomon Herzenstein
Endemic fauna of China
Freshwater fish of China
Fish described in 1888